Sheikh Waqas Akram (born 26 August 1976) is a Pakistani politician and a former member of the National Assembly of Pakistan from November 2002 to November 2007 and from March 2008 to March 2013. He was the Minister of State for Labour and Manpower.

Education 

According to him, he holds a master's degree in Information Systems Management from Central Queensland University. He did his bachelor's degree from Government College Lahore in History and Journalism. He did his matriculation from Abbottabad public School. He remained the Federal Minister of Education. He organised Malala Fund Event in Paris with the help of UNESCO.

Political career 
He won 2008 Pakistani general election from NA-89 on PML-Q ticket. Previously, he had been Parliamentary Secretary of economic Affairs division, also remained Chairman standing committee on Petroleum  and natural resources and a senior vice President of PML-Q. He was Member of National Assembly of Pakistan and Minister of State for Labor and Manpower. He was the Federal minister of Education in Asif Ali Zardari govt as a coalition partner of the govt. He could not take part in 2013 general elections because returning officer rejected his nomination papers based on a letter sent by HEC about his fake degrees.  He later challenged his rejection in a higher court Tribunal which allowed him to contest Election. He decided not to contest the elections. He is one of the prominent leaders of PML (N). Later he participated in 2018 Election as an independent candidate but failed to win against Ghulam Bibi Bharwana.

On 11 March 2023, Akram joined the Pakistan Tehreek-i-Insaf declaring allegiance to the Haqiqi Azadi March and the party's manifesto.

See also 
 2013 Pakistani general election
 2008 Pakistani general election

References 

Pakistan Muslim League (Q) politicians
Living people
Politicians from Punjab, Pakistan
People from Jhang District
Central Queensland University alumni
Government College University, Lahore alumni
1976 births
Pakistani MNAs 2002–2007